Qeshlaq-e Faraj may refer to:
Qeshlaq-e Faraj Esmail
Qeshlaq-e Faraj Hajj Owraj
Qeshlaq-e Faraj Moharram